Beatles Bop – Hamburg Days is a compilation album of the 1961-1962 recordings of The Beatles with Tony Sheridan done in Hamburg for Polydor with producer Bert Kaempfert. Released by Bear Family Records in 2001, this is, to date, the most complete collection of these recordings featuring both mono and stereo mixes. This collection excludes the other recordings featured on the My Bonnie and The Beatles' First albums that were done by other musicians under "The Beat Brothers" name. But it does include a version of "Swanee River" by other musicians as a comparative to the lost Beatles recording.

The album was released in a standard two-CD jewel box with a 99-page booklet as well as a Deluxe Edition packaged in an LP-sized box set which included a 120-page hardcover book which featured rare photos, documents, single picture sleeves and historical notes written by the swedish Beatles scholar Hans Olof Gottfridsson. The set has since been deleted from Bear Family's catalogue.

On 8 November 2011, Time Life published a similar two disc compilation entitled The Beatles With Tony Sheridan – F1rst Recordings: 50th Anniversary Edition. This time the non-Beatles song Swanee River is omitted and this edition includes a 32-page booklet by the same author.

Track listing
Disc one – Mono
"My Bonnie" (German intro) (traditional)
"My Bonnie" (English intro)
"My Bonnie" (Without intro)
"The Saints" (traditional)
"Cry for a Shadow" (Harrison/Lennon) (instrumental)
"Why (Can't You Love Me Again)" (Compton/Sheridan)
"Nobody's Child" (Coben, Foree)
"Ain't She Sweet" (Ager/Yellen)
"Take Out Some Insurance on Me, Baby"/"If You Love Me, Baby" (Hall/Singleton)
"Sweet Georgia Brown" (Bernie, Casey, Pinkard)
"Sweet Georgia Brown" (new lyrics)
"Sweet Georgia Brown" (U.S. version)
"Take Out Some Insurance on Me, Baby"/"If You Love Me, Baby" (U.S. version)
"Ain't She Sweet" (U.S. version)
"Nobody's Child" (U.S. version)
"My Bonnie" (medley version)
"The Saints" (medley version)
"Cry for a Shadow" (medley version 1)
"Cry for a Shadow" (medley version 2)
"Swanee River" (with intro) (Foster)
"Swanee River" (without intro)

Disc two – Stereo
"My Bonnie" (German intro)
"My Bonnie" (English intro)
"My Bonnie" (Without intro)
"The Saints"
"Cry for a Shadow"
"Why (Can't You Love Me Again)"
"Nobody's Child"
"Ain't She Sweet"
"Take Out Some Insurance on Me, Baby"/"If You Love Me, Baby"
"Sweet Georgia Brown"
"Sweet Georgia Brown" (new lyrics)
"My Bonnie" (medley version)
"The Saints" (medley version)
"Cry for a Shadow" (medley version 1)
"Cry for a Shadow" (medley version 2)
"Swanee River" (with intro)
"Swanee River" (without intro)

 The recording of "Swanee River" does not feature The Beatles, as tapes of The Beatles version were apparently destroyed in a fire. These non-Beatles versions are included to give an example of what The Beatles version may have sounded like.

References

2001 compilation albums
Albums produced by Bert Kaempfert
German-language albums
The Beatles with Tony Sheridan albums
Bear Family Records compilation albums